The ISU is a British trade union representing representing staff in the Borders, Customs and Immigration functions of the Home Office.

The union was founded in 1981 as the Immigration Service Union.  It was a split from the Society of Civil and Public Servants (SCPS), founded in protest at the SCPS calling for the repeal of the Immigration Act 1971.

The ISU is politically independent and not a member of the Trades Union Congress. PCS, the SCPS's successor, sees ISU as a yellow union, as some senior managers encouraged its splitting off, although its independence has been certified by the Certification Officer.

Membership of the union reached 4,263 in 2006, but, in common with all Civil Service unions, fell after the ending of payroll wage check-off (subscriptions automatically deducted where workers have ticked to confirm they wish to be in any recognised union to their employer) in 2015. It declined to 3,018 in that year. In 2020, membership stood at 3,043.

The ISU does not generally take industrial action. In 2012, ISU members followed other public sector unions in agreeing to strike against changes to civil service pensions. This vote resulted in a rapid climbdown on the pension cuts plans. Similarly, planned heavy-handed tactics to stem irregular, dangerous, very small vessel immigration have also been the subject of polls for some form of industrial action in 2022.

General Secretaries
1981: P. J. Taylor
1997: Martin Slade
2003: Peter Stowe
2010: Paul Duckhouse
2013: Lucy Moreton
2019: Mark Gribbin

References

Trade unions established in 1981
Trade unions in the United Kingdom
Trade unions based in Essex